The 72nd Indianapolis 500 was held at the Indianapolis Motor Speedway in Speedway, Indiana, on Sunday May 29, 1988. Team Penske dominated the month, sweeping the top three starting positions with Rick Mears winning the pole position, Danny Sullivan at the center of the front row, and Al Unser, Sr. on the outside. Mears set a new track record, becoming the first driver to break the 220 mph barrier in time trials. On race day, the Penske teammates proceeded to lead 192 of the 200 laps, with Rick Mears taking the checkered flag, his third-career Indy 500 victory. The race represented the milestone 50th victory in Championship car racing for owner Roger Penske and Penske Racing.

The victory was the first of six consecutive Indy 500 wins by the Chevy Indy V-8 engine, and seven consecutive overall by Ilmor-constructed powerplants. The victory also marked a triumphant return of success for the Penske chassis (in this case the PC-17), after dismal results in 1987 (PC-16), and sparse use in the previous four seasons.

The race was the third round of the 1988 CART PPG Indy Car World Series, and was sanctioned by USAC.

Background
Defending champion Al Unser Sr. returned to Penske to join a three-car effort with full-time drivers Rick Mears and Danny Sullivan. After a dismal go around with the PC-16 in 1987, Penske introduced the brand-new PC-17 ('88), with promise. Mears and Sullivan, respectively, won the pole positions for the first two races of the CART season. For the third year, Penske was fielding the Chevy Ilmor Indy V-8 engine.

Back-to-back defending CART champion, and 1986 Indy winner Bobby Rahal returned for what would be his last season at Truesports. The team dropped the Cosworth DFX and they took up the development of the Judd AV engine. The engine was known to be down on horsepower, but excelled in fuel mileage and reliability, particularly in the 500-mile races.

Among the other changes included Al Unser Jr., who left Shierson after a winless 1987 campaign and re-joined Galles. Galles was now running the Ilmor Chevy engine, after running the Brabham-Honda and Buick in previous years. Raul Boesel took Unser's place in the #30 Domino's Pizza entry.

During a tire test session at the Speedway in September 1987, Roberto Guerrero had a crash, and suffered a serious head injury that put him in a coma for seventeen days. After a lengthy recovery, Guerrero was back in the cockpit for 1988. Jim Crawford, who suffered serious leg injuries during time trials in 1987, also returned, signing with King Racing.

Billy Vukovich III, son of Bill Vukovich II, and grandson of two-time winner Bill Vukovich, would become the first third-generation driver in Indy history.

Many of the cars in the field were sporting new style wheels with flush discs, giving the 1988 month of May a unique visual appearance.

After becoming famous for being "first in line" at the Indy 500 from 1950-1987, longtime fan Larry Bisceglia of Chicago, and later from Phoenix, fell ill and missed the 1988 race. With failing health, he died December 7, 1988.

Rule changes
Starting in 1988, teams were allowed to have six crew members over the wall during a pit stop. The crews would consist of four tire changers, a fueler, and a fuel vent/airhose man. Previously they were only allowed five (i.e., three tire changers). This was due in part to the fact that after the series changed from bias-ply tires to radials, the left-front tire (which at the time was seldom changed) would now be changed much more frequently.

For 1988, turbocharger "boost" pressure was reduced from 47 to 45 inHG. Stock-block engines were permitted 55 inHG.

Race schedule

Practice - Week 1

Rookie Orientation
Six drivers took part in rookie orientation. John Andretti led the group, putting in 220 laps with a top speed of 201.974 mph. After being denied entry five years ago, Harry Sauce returned to attempt the program once again.

Saturday May 7
Opening day saw Raul Boesel first out on the track for Shierson. Dick Simon (211.665 mph) posted the best lap of the day, with less than 15 minutes to go in the session.

Sunday May 8
The track closed about two hours early due to rain. Mario Andretti set the best lap of the day (210.970 mph), but did not eclipse Simon's speed from Saturday.

Monday May 9
Rick Mears turned the fastest lap of the month thus far at 213.118 mph. Two cars, Teo Fabi in the Porsche entry, and Ludwig Heimrath suffered mechanical/engine-related problems.

Tuesday May 10
Rick Mears turned the fastest unofficial practice lap in Indy history, breaking the 220 mph for the first time. His lap of 220.048 mph was just a tick faster than Mario Andretti's lap of 219.995 mph.

Roberto Guerrero was involved in the first crash of the week. He spun in turn one and tapped the outside wall. His car suffered damage to the rear wing. He was not injured.

Wednesday May 11
After two days of Mears topping the speed chart, Mario Andretti moved back into the top spot. His lap of 221.565 mph broke the day-old unofficial track record at 5:45 p.m.

Thursday May 12
Ludwig Heimrath went high in turn 2 and brushed the outside wall, the second crash of the month. His car whipped around, and hit the wall again. He was not injured, and car had light damage.

Mario Andretti (219.084 mph) led the speed chart, with Scott Brayton second.

Friday May 13
The final day of practice was anticipated to be a duel between Rick Mears and Mario Andretti, the two drivers who had distanced themselves from the rest of the field. Mears and Andretti finished the day with identical laps at 221.465 mph to tie at the top of the speed chart. Danny Sullivan came in third-best with a lap of 218.446 mph.

Andretti finished the week of practice with the fastest over speed, set on Wednesday. Mears was second, and the pair went into time trials as the favorites for the pole position.

Time Trials - First weekend

Pole day - Saturday May 14
On pole day morning, Rick Mears blistered the track with a lap of 222.827 mph during the morning practice session. It was a new all-time unofficial track record. Mario Andretti (220.372 mph) was close behind with the second-fastest. Raul Boesel and Tom Bigelow suffered single-car crashes during the session.

Mario Andretti drew the coveted first qualifying attempt. After leading the speed charts in practice much of the week, his qualifying speed was inconsistent and disappointingly slow. His first lap of 217.014 mph was his fastest, but 4 mph slower than he practiced a day earlier. His final lap of 212.761 mph pulled his four-lap average down to 214.692 mph. He claims to have hit a patch of oil-dry in turn four, which was laid down earlier that morning due to Boesel's crash. 

About one hour into the session, Al Unser Sr. took to the track and completed his attempt at 215.270 mph, good enough to take over the provisional pole position. Derek Daly and Scott Brayton completed runs over 212 mph, and by 1 p.m., the field was filled to ten cars.

At 1:21 p.m., Danny Sullivan took to the track and set a one-lap track record of 217.749 mph on his second lap. His four-lap average fell short of a record, but his speed of 216.214 mph took over the pole position for the moment. Not to be upstaged, Rick Mears took to the track at 2 p.m. His first lap of 220.453 mph was an all-time official track record, the first driver to break the 220 mph barrier. His four-lap average of 219.198 mph won him the coveted pole position. It was his then-record fourth Indy 500 pole position.

With Penske cars Mears, Sullivan, and Unser, ranked 1st-2nd-3rd, the team had the opportunity to become the first team ever to sweep all three spots on the front row of the starting grid. After Mears' run, the track stayed mostly quiet until the final hour.

With better conditions at 5 p.m., Arie Luyendyk put his car in the field at just over 213 mph. Al Unser Jr. was the last car with a realistic shot at the front row. Unser Jr. fell short, with a speed of 214.186 mph, good enough for 5th position.

At the end of the day, Bobby Rahal was among those not yet in the field. His first presentation to the line was aborted when the car would not crank. He waved off two attempts, the second attempt was averaging 212.8 mph after three laps. A. J. Foyt went out early, but debris on the track forced him to pull off. His second attempt was too slow, and he waved off.

At the end of the day, the field was filled to 19 cars.

Second day - Sunday May 15
At hot 88 degree day kept cars off the track most of the afternoon. At about 5:30 p.m., Jim Crawford put his car in the field at 210.564 mph. Bobby Rahal was the only other qualifier, with a speed of 208.526 mph, slower than his speeds from Saturday.

At the close of the first weekend of time trials, there were 21 cars in the field. Among those not in the field yet were A. J. Foyt, Raul Boesel, Johnny Rutherford, and rookie John Andretti.

Practice - Week 2

Monday May 16
Rookie Harry Sauce spun in turn one during the final phase of his rookie test. The car was not damaged. Mario Andretti (216.398 mph) was the fastest of the day.

Tuesday May 17
Gordon Johncock took to the track for his first shakedown laps of the month. Rookie Dominic Dobson completed his refresher test. Danny Sullivan (214.183 mph), was the fastest of the day.

Wednesday May 18
Spike Gehlhausen wrecked hard in turn 1, and was taken to the hospital. X-rays were negative, however, but he was out for the rest of the month. After struggling getting up to speed, Harry Sauce withdrew. Rookie Dale Coyne also announced he would not attempt to qualify. Pancho Carter (208.574 mph) was the fastest non-qualified driver, while Al Unser, Sr. (210.280 mph) was the fastest overall.

Thursday May 19
Raul Boesel (213.270 mph) topped the speed chart for the day. Rookie Scott Atchison wrecked in turn 4. he spent the night in the hospital, but was cleared to drive.

Friday May 20
The final full day of practice saw Pancho Carter (213.878 mph) and Raul Boesel (213.068 mph) lead the non-qualified drivers. Mario Andretti drove a back-up car to 212.314 mph.

Time Trials - Second weekend

Third Day - Saturday May 21
Nine cars completed qualifying runs, filling the field to 30 cars. Raul Boesel (211.058 mph) was the fastest of the day, with Dominic Dobson (210.096 mph) second fastest, and the fastest rookie. A. J. Foyt secured a starting position in his record 31st consecutive Indy 500.

Pancho Carter crashed twice during the day. On his final qualifying lap, he brushed the wall in the final turn, and slid and spun down the mainstretch. Later in the day, he wrecked his backup car in turn 2 during a practice run. He was uninjured.

Billy Vukovich III, grandson of two-time winner Bill Vukovich, and son of race veteran Bill Vukovich II qualified with a solid run in the final hour. He became the first third-generation driver in Indy 500 history. As time expired, Steve Chassey made his third and final attempt, which was good enough to make the field.

Bump Day - Sunday May 22
The final day of time trials opened with three positions left unfilled. Johnny Rutherford was the first car to make an attempt, and qualified comfortably at 208.442 mph. Later, Howdy Holmes and Stan Fox (driving Foyt backup car) filled the field to 33 cars. Scott Atchison (205.142 mph) was the first car on the bubble.

Atchison survived three attempts, but Ludwig Heimrath finally bumped him out at 3:45 p.m. The move put Rich Vogler (206.463 mph) on the bubble. Ed Pimm made an attempt but wrecked, and Gordon Johncock waved off after a lap of only 206.049 mph. Vogler waited, and the team wheeled out a back-up car just in case.

After crashing twice on Saturday, Pancho Carter's team purchased a back-up car from Hemelgarn Racing, but with practice time running out, they were having difficulty getting the car up to speed. Meanwhile, A. J. Foyt rolled another backup car out of the garage area. George Snider decided he did not want to qualify the car, and Foyt quickly consummated a deal with Johnny Parsons. Foyt shook the car down, and Parsons took it out for a practice run. At 5:29 p.m., he went high and smacked the wall in the northchute, ending his chances to qualify.

At 5:43 p.m., Gordon Johncock made his third and final attempt, this time bumping Vogler. However, Johncock himself was now on the bubble (206.693 mph) with less than ten minutes renaming. Rich Vogler quickly climbed into his backup car, and as time expired, bumped his way back into the field with a speed of 207.126 mph. Johncock was out, and Pancho Carter was left waiting in line.

Carburetion Day - Thursday May 26
A total of 31 of the 33 qualified cars took to the track on the final practice session. Two of the alternates took laps, for a total of 33 cars on the track. A few cars experienced minor mechanical problems, but there were no accidents. Mario Andretti (215.105 mph) was the fastest car of the day. Penske teammates Danny Sullivan and pole-sitter Rick Mears were second and third.

Penske Racing, with driver Danny Sullivan, won the Miller Pit Stop Contest.

The day before the race, Al Unser Jr. reportedly came down with a stomach flu or possibly food poisoning. However, he rested and planned to drive on race day.

Starting grid

Alternates
First alternate: Gordon Johncock  (#60) - Bumped
Second alternate: Rich Vogler (#27T) - Back up car
Third alternate: Scott Atchison  (#55) - Bumped

Failed to Qualify
Gary Bettenhausen (#46) - Waved off, too slow
John Jones (#12) - Waved off, too slow
Pancho Carter (#28) - Waved off, too slow
Johnny Parsons (#36) - Incomplete run
Ed Pimm (#27) - Wrecked  during qualifying
Tom Bigelow (#77) - Practiced, but did not attempt to qualify
Dick Ferguson (#27)- Car taken over by Pimm
George Snider (#84) - Practiced, but did not attempt to qualify
Spike Gehlhausen (#87) - Practice crash, injured
Harry Sauce  (#36) - Withdrew
Dale Coyne  (#39) - Withdrew

Race summary

Start
Danny Sullivan darted into the lead at the green flag, with Rick Mears in second. In turn two, Scott Brayton spun, collecting Roberto Guerrero, and both cars crashed into the outside wall. Tony Bettenhausen Jr., behind the incident, also crashed. On lap 6, the green flag came back out. Danny Sullivan got the jump on the start, and pulled out to a comfortable lead.

The top five would be Sullivan, Rick Mears, Al Unser Sr., Al Unser Jr., and Mario Andretti.

First half
During the first sequence of pit stops, Tom Sneva crashed coming out of turn four on lap 34. Under the yellow, Teo Fabi, using the Porsche engine, pulled out of his pit stall with one of the rear wheels not secured. The wheel came off, and the car bottomed out, creating a terminal oil leak. Danny Sullivan continued to dominate in the lead, with Rick Mears falling to 10th place with handling problems. Al Unser Sr. and Al Unser Jr. continued to hold on to the top five, with Arie Luyendyk also lurking. Jim Crawford also began working his way into the top ten.

Three additional single-car crashes occurred prior to the halfway point. A. J. Foyt wrecked coming out of turn two on lap 58, due to handling problems and slick conditions. On the ensuing restart on lap 64, Arie Luyendyk tagged Ludwig Heimrath Jr., sending Heimrath spinning and crashing out of turn four. Steve Chassey crashed in turn 4 on lap 81, suffering a concussion.

Both Mario Andretti (gearbox) and Al Unser Jr. (CV joint) came to the pits for long repairs. Both cars re-entered the race several laps down.

After suffering early handling issues, Rick Mears radioed his crew and requested that they switch to the old style wheels. The car was not handling well with the new style flush disc wheels. The crew had to scramble back to the transporter to collect sets of older style wheels, and have all the tires re-mounted back in the garage area.

On lap 93, the caution came out for debris on the track. Rick Mears had just un-lapped himself, and got back on to the lead lap. Leader Danny Sullivan pitted, giving the lead for the first time to Jim Crawford in the Buick-powered machine. Crawford blistered the track for the next several laps, with a noticeably drastic racing line, dipping deep below the white line, and aggressive dicing through traffic.

Second half

At lap 100, Jim Crawford led, with Rick Mears finally back up to second, Al Unser Sr. third, and now Danny Sullivan back to fourth. On lap 102, Sullivan's front wing adjusters broke, sending his car up into the outside wall in turn 1. After leading 92 laps, Sullivan was out, but Penske teammates Rick Mears and Al Unser Sr. were now in control.

After a caution for debris (Unser ran over a rabbit), Rick Mears took the lead on lap 113.

Johnny Rutherford crashed in turn 1, similar to Sullivan's crash. It would be Rutherford's final lap of Indy 500 competition (he would fail to qualify in subsequent years and officially retired in 1994). After trading positions, Rick Mears took over the lead for good on lap 129.

With Mears pulling away, the rest of the top three was being battled out amongst Al Unser Sr. and Jim Crawford. Emerson Fittipaldi worked his way up to the top five, as did Bobby Rahal in the Judd.

After several long pit stops to repair gearbox problems, an oil leak, and electrical gremlins, Mario Andretti finally called it quits. With the leaders nearing lap 170, Mario was about 50 laps down with a dead engine. Mario was credited with 118 laps in 20th place.

Finish
With Rick Mears seemingly in control, the only battle that remained was for second place. Emerson Fittipaldi was running second, but he was deep in traffic. In the final twenty laps, USAC officials were contemplating issuing a two-lap penalty to Fittipaldi for passing a car under the yellow while exiting the pits on lap 164. After first penalizing Fittipaldi, then tentatively retracting the penalty, USAC henceforth decided to impose it. The penalty dropped Fittipaldi down to 7th. The resulting scoring adjustments elevated Jim Crawford into second place, Al Unser Sr. into third.

On lap 194, Jim Crawford got sideways in turn three, which flat-spotted his tires. He ducked into the pit area to change tires, but the crew had difficulty changing them, and he lost several seconds. He dropped back to 6th on the track. Suddenly Penske teammates Rick Mears and Al Unser Sr. were running 1st-2nd. Moments later, on lap 197 a piece of bodywork flew off of Michael Andretti's car. The yellow came out, and the safety crews were unable to clean up the debris before the white flag came out for the final lap. The race finished under caution with Rick Mears winning his third Indy 500. For the moment, Al Unser Sr. was second, Michael Andretti third, and Bobby Rahal worked all the way up to 4th in the Judd-powered entry.

After the race, during the post-race scoring evaluation, Patrick Racing threatened to protest Emerson Fittipaldi's two-lap penalty. USAC claimed that while exiting the pits, Fittipaldi passed the lapped car of Rich Vogler, and did not properly honor the blend-in rule. Fittipaldi claimed that Vogler waved him by as they exited turn two to the backstretch. When Vogler got word of Fittipaldi's penalty, he immediately went to the USAC officials and corroborated Fittipaldi's account. Vogler claimed that he was 8-10 laps down at the time and purposely waved Fittipaldi by, and that the penalty was "unjust." Under the rules, slower cars were permitted to wave other faster cars by during yellows, a move primarily used in order to not to impede the leaders. USAC re-evaluated the situation, and when official results were posted Monday morning, they retracted Fittipaldi's penalty once and for all. Fittipaldi's laps were reinstated, which elevated him to a second-place finish. Al Unser Sr. was officially third, denying Penske Racing of their first 1st-2nd Indy sweep. Jim Crawford's exciting day finished with a 6th place, the Buick V-6's best finish to-date.

One year after his best ever finish in the Indianapolis 500, Dick Simon rallied from a 16th starting spot to finish 9th in his final 500 as a driver. During the season finale weekend in Miami, Simon would announce his retirement from driving to concentrate running his race team.

Race Results

Box Score

 = Indianapolis 500 rookie;  = Former Indianapolis 500 winner

Statistics

Broadcasting

Radio
The race was carried live on the IMS Radio Network. In September 1987, Paul Page left NBC Sports and joined ABC. As a result, Page left the IMS Radio Network, and vacated his position as Voice of the 500. Veteran personality Lou Palmer, who debuted with the network in 1958, was elevated to the chief announcer position for 1988.

Outside of Page's departure, a few changes were made to the crew for 1988. Pancho Carter, who failed to qualify for the race, served as "driver expert." Bob Lamey debuted on the crew, taking the Turn 2 location on top of the VIP Suites. Howdy Bell, who was previously in that spot, moved to the pit area and shared the north pits with Chuck Marlowe. Luke Walton covered the starting command during the pre-race, but did not have a role during the race itself.

After the race, with Palmer now in the booth, Bob Forbes conducted the victory lane winner's interview. Sally Larvick (Paul Page's wife), who had worked on the crew from 1982-1987 in only a limited role (conducting interviews with celebrities, etc.), elevated to a full pit reporter starting in 1988.

Television
The race was carried live flag-to-flag coverage in the United States on ABC Sports. Major changes were ushered in for 1988. Don Ohlmeyer was brought in as one of the directors, and a new style of the broadcast reflected Ohlmeyer's influence. The opening tease featured Alan Silvestri's score from the film The Delta Force, in a medley with the instrumental song "Katydid's Ditty" by Mason Williams. The Delta Force intros (known as the "Page Teases"), narrated by Paul Page, would become a popular fixture of the ABC telecasts of the Indy 500, Brickyard 400, and other Indycar races, through 1998 and reprised again in 2001.

With Jim McKay departed, Paul Page served as both host and play-by-play announcer. Bobby Unser and Sam Posey returned as color commentators, and this three-man booth crew would cover the Indy 500 and other Indycar races on ABC through 1995.

Jack Arute and Brian Hammons served as pit reporters, the only time a crew of only two men covered the pits since going to a live broadcast.

New RaceCam angles debuted for 1988. Along with the "over-the-shoulder" camera, there were also cameras facing backwards from the cars, as well as a cockpit camera looking up at the driver.

Notes

References

Works cited
1988 Indianapolis 500 Day-By-Day Trackside Report For the Media
Indianapolis 500 History: Race & All-Time Stats - Official Site
1988 Indianapolis 500 Radio Broadcast, Indianapolis Motor Speedway Radio Network

Indianapolis 500 races
Indianapolis 500
Indianapolis 500
1988 in American motorsport